A Quadrupel (Flemish for 'quadruple') is a type of beer, with an alcohol by volume of 9.1% to 14.2%. 

There is little agreement on the status of Quadrupel as a beer style. Writer Tim Webb notes that similar beers are called Grand Cru in Belgium even though the idea is derived from the Belgian beer naming convention of that uses numerical values descriptive of the number of prominent ingredients.

Quadrupel is the brand name of a strong seasonal beer La Trappe Quadrupel brewed by De Koningshoeven Brewery in the Netherlands, one of the thirteen Trappist beers in the world.

In other countries, particularly the United States, quadrupel or quad has become a generic trademark. The term may refer to an especially strong style of dark ale with a spicy, ripe fruit flavor.

See also
Dubbel
Tripel
Trappist beer
Beer in Belgium

References

Beer in the Netherlands
Trappist beer